Peter Anthony Dale Collier (June 2, 1939 – November 1, 2019) was an American writer and publisher. He was the founding publisher of conservative Encounter Books in California and held that position from 1998 until he resigned in 2005. The company moved from San Francisco to New York City, and Collier was replaced as publisher by Roger Kimball.

With David Horowitz, Collier wrote many books that made The New York Times Best Seller list and was described by the New York Times Book Review as "the premier biographer of American dynastic tragedy."  His book Medal of Honor: Profiles of Valor Beyond the Call of Duty (2003) profiled living recipients of the Medal.

Biography
Collier was born in Hollywood, Los Angeles, California and attended Hollywood Progressive School. He grew up in Burbank and attended the University of California, Berkeley, earning a B.A. in English in 1961 and a M.A. in 1963. He served as a civil rights activist in the South in 1964.

Returning to California, Collier taught Freshman English at UC Berkeley from 1964 to 1969 and again as a Visiting Writer from 1977-81.  He also taught at UC Santa Cruz and at Miles College in Birmingham, Alabama. 
Collier is a fellow of the National Endowment of the Arts (1980). He lectured abroad for the United States Information Service in 1980, 1987, and 1998.

Collier was teaching at the University of California, Berkeley, in 1966 when he became an editor at radical Leftist Ramparts magazine, the splashy, four-color publication that was influential in transmitting New Left ideas into the mainstream. Collier wrote about the Black Panthers, the American Indian Movement and other radical organizations for Ramparts.  He edited Ramparts until 1972.

As the Vietnam War came to an end, he and fellow Ramparts writer David Horowitz became disillusioned when the New Left turned a blind eye to the atrocities committed by the communist victors in Southeast Asia—the tiger cages and boat people in South Vietnam, the genocide in Cambodia.  They began a slow motion political transition that led them away from the Left and ultimately made them, in their own term, "second thoughters" engaged in ongoing political combat with their former comrades. Collier and Horowitz traveled to Nicaragua in 1987 at the invitation of the State Department to encourage the "civic resistance" against the Sandinistas. The same year they organized a "Second Thoughts Convention" in Washington D.C. Their book about leaving the Left and becoming its enemies, Destructive Generation (1989), was compared to Whittaker Chambers' Witness. 

He served as a co-author with Horowitz on several books on American history and political science. Their biographies The Rockefellers: An American Dynasty (1976) and The Kennedys: An American Drama (1984) both made the New York Times Best Seller list. The Kennedys also made the year-end New York Times notable books of the year list in 1984. Later, they co-wrote critical of the left and of leftists, including The Anti-Chomsky Reader (2004). He was a co-founder with Horowitz of the Center for the Study of Popular Culture.

Collier lived in Nevada City, California. His son Nick Collier is a creative director, digital strategist, and entrepreneur.

Collier died from acute myeloid leukemia on November 1, 2019, at age 80, in a hospital in Sacramento, California.

Works

Co-authored with David Horowitz
 
 The Rockefellers: An American Dynasty Summit Books (1976) 
 The Kennedys: An American Drama  Encounter Books (1984) 
 The Fords: An American Epic Encounter Books (1987) 
 Destructive Generation  Encounter Books (1989) 
 Deconstructing the Left: From Vietnam to the Clinton Era 
 The Roosevelts: An American Saga Simon & Schuster (1994) 
 The Heterodoxy Handbook: How to Survive the PC Campus (editor and contributor) Regnery Publishing (1994) 
 The Race Card: White Guilt, Black Resentment, and the Assault on Truth and Justice (editor and contributor) Prima Lifestyles (1997) 
 The Anti-Chomsky Reader Encounter Books (2004)

Novels
 Downriver Dell Pub Co (1978) 
 Things in Glocca Morra Encounter (2021)

Non-fiction
 
 When Shall They Rest? The Cherokees' Long Struggle with America Dell Publishing (1975) 
 Second Thoughts: Former Radicals Look Back at the Sixties (editor) Madison Books (1989) 
 Second Thoughts About Race in America (editor) Madison Books (1991) 
 The Fondas: A Hollywood Dynasty Berkley Books (1992) 
 Medal of Honor: Portraits of Valor Beyond the Call of Duty Book and Multimedia DVD with photography by Nick Del Calzo Artis (2003) 
 Political Woman: The Big Little Life of Jeane Kirkpatrick Encounter Books (2012) 
 Wings of Valor: Honoring America's Fighter Aces with photography by Nick del Calzo. Naval Institute Press (2016)

Other
 The King's Giraffe children's tale with Mary Jo Collier. Stephane Poulin (Illustrator) Simon & Schuster Books (1996) 
 Collier's short fiction has appeared in Triquarterly, Canto, the Seattle Review, and the Missouri Review.

References

External links
 

1939 births
2019 deaths
20th-century American male writers
20th-century American non-fiction writers
21st-century American male writers
21st-century American non-fiction writers
American male non-fiction writers
American political writers
American tax resisters
Deaths from cancer in California
Deaths from acute myeloid leukemia
New Left
People from Burbank, California
People from Hollywood, Los Angeles
People from Nevada City, California
UC Berkeley College of Letters and Science alumni
University of California, Berkeley College of Letters and Science faculty
Writers from Los Angeles